is a Japanese actor and dancer.

Life and career
Moriyama started training in dance when he was 5 years old. He trained in jazz dance, tap dance, ballet and hip-hop, and he appeared in several stage roles. He officially made his stage debut with 1999 Boys Time. In 2008, he played the lead character in a Japanese version of the musical RENT.

In the 2004 film Socrates in Love, he played a high school age hero trying to deal with his terminally-ill girlfriend. He also portrayed the character Kakuta in the film 20th Century Boys.

He starred in Kueki Ressha. He also appeared in Kiyoshi Kurosawa's television drama Penance and Junji Sakamoto's film A Chorus of Angels. In July 2021 he performed in the opening ceremony of the Tokyo Olympic Games.

Filmography

Film
 Crying Out Love in the Center of the World (2004)
 Smile (2007)
 One Million Yen Girl (2008)
 20th Century Boys 1: Beginning of the End (2008)
 20th Century Boys 2: The Last Hope (2009)
 20th Century Boys 3: Redemption (2009)
 Fish Story (2009)
 Moteki (2010)
 Seiji: Riku no Sakana (2012)
 The Drudgery Train (2012)
 A Chorus of Angels (2012)
 Saint Young Men (2013)
 Human Trust (2013)
 Rage (2016)
 Vision (2018), Gaku
 Samurai Marathon (2019)
 I Was a Secret Bitch (2019), Misawa
 The Horse Thieves: Roads of Time (2019)
 Underdog (2020), Suenaga
 We Couldn't Become Adults (2021), Makoto Satō
 Inu-Oh (2021), Tomona (voice)
 Miss Osaka (2022)
 Mountain Woman (2023), Mountain man
 Shin Kamen Rider (2023), Ichiro Midorikawa

Television
 Waterboys 2 (2003)
 Itoshi Kimi e (2004)
 Kiken na Aneki (2005)
 Moteki (2010)
 Penance (2012)
 Inagakike no Moshu (2017)
 Miotsukushi Ryōrichō (2017)
 Idaten (2019), Kōzō Minobe
 Thus Spoke Kishibe Rohan (2020), Shishi Jūgo
 Prism (2022), Yūma

Video games
Dragon Quest Heroes II (2016)

References

External links
 
 

Japanese male film actors
Japanese male musical theatre actors
Japanese male television actors
1984 births
Living people
Actors from Kobe
20th-century Japanese male actors
21st-century Japanese male actors